Mungan is a Turkish surname. Notable people with the surname include:

Esra Mungan, Turkish academic
Murathan Mungan (born 1955), Turkish author, playwright, and poet
Zeynel Mungan (born 1952), Turkish scientist

See also
Mungan Syndrome

Turkish-language surnames